Mapalana is a village in Matara District, Sri Lanka, 175 kilometers from Colombo. It is about 3 kilometers from Kamburupitiya where the University of Ruhuna placed its Faculty of Agriculture.

The name of this village was "Maha Pala Ana" in ancient times which means "The Great Garden with fruits". Of course this is a very ancient village. The best example is the place named as "Nidan-Gala" which means "The rock of treasures" ~ treasures of kings.

Populated places in Southern Province, Sri Lanka
Populated places in Matara District